The Lauge-Hansen classification is a system of categorizing ankle fractures based on the foot position and the force applied.


Classification

See also
 Danis–Weber classification
 Herscovici classification

References

Bone fractures
Ankle fracture classifications
Injuries of ankle and foot